Tommaso D'Avalos, O.P. or Tommaso de Avalos (1610 – 4 December 1642) was a Roman Catholic prelate who served as Bishop of Lucera (1642).

Biography
Tommaso D'Avalos was born in Pescara, Italy in March 1610 and ordained a priest in the Order of Preachers. On 24 March 1642, he was appointed during the papacy of Pope Urban VIII as Bishop of Lucera (1642). On 30 March 1642, he was consecrated bishop by Alessandro Cesarini (iuniore), Cardinal-Deacon of Sant'Eustachio, with Giovanni Battista Altieri, Bishop Emeritus of Camerino, and Deodato Scaglia, Bishop of Melfi e Rapolla, serving as co-consecrators. He served as Bishop of Lucera until his death on 4 December 1642.

References

External links and additional sources
 (for Chronology of Bishops)  
 (for Chronology of Bishops)  

17th-century Italian Roman Catholic bishops
Bishops appointed by Pope Urban VIII
1610 births
1642 deaths